James Barr (born 1976) is a British author of a number of historical works on the Middle East. He is currently a visiting fellow at King's College London.

Biography
Barr read modern history at Lincoln College, Oxford.

In 2006, Barr's history on Lawrence of Arabia and the British war effort in the Middle East was published by Bloomsbury. His second book, A Line in the Sand, on Anglo-French rivalry in the Middle East during the interwar period and World War II, appeared in 2011.

He has worked for the Daily Telegraph, and in Westminster and in London.

Publications
Setting the Desert on Fire: T. E. Lawrence and Britain's Secret War in Arabia, 1916-1918 (2006) 
A Line in the Sand: Britain, France and the Struggle that Shaped the Middle East (2011). Paperback (2012), 
Lords of the Desert: Britain's Struggle with America to Dominate the Middle East (2018).

Links
Source
 Author's site 
Notes

Alumni of Lincoln College, Oxford
1976 births
Living people
British historians
Academics of King's College London